94 Terror is a 2018 Ugandan war-drama film set in the Rwandan genocide of 1994. The film premiered on the 14th of December 2018 at a red carpet event at Theatre Labonita in Kampala and won Best Viewers’ Choice Movie Award at the 2018 Uganda Film Festival Awards in the first week after the release.

Plot
Keza narrowly escapes death during the 1994 Rwandan genocide in which the rest of her family perishes. She and her mates Shema, a Hutu and Mutesi, a Tutsi get on a run to sneak out of Rwanda to Uganda across the Kagera River border.

Reception
94 Terror was very well received and immediately won Best Viewers’ Choice Movie Award at the 2018 Uganda Film Festival Awards in the first week after the release.  It went on to win the best Costume award at The African Film Festival (TAFF) in Dallas Texas in 2019. It also led nominations at the 2019 Golden Movie Awards Africa (GMAA) in Ghana with 18 nominations including Best Movie Drama and Best Screenplay.
The film received a double selection at both the Straight Jacket Guerrilla Festival in Mexico and the FICMEC Nador International Festival of Common Memory in France.

Production
It was produced, written and directed by Richard Mulindwa and stars an all Ugandan cast of Ninsiima Ronah, Joan Agaba, Muyimbwa Phiona, Nalubega Rashida, Shadic Smith, Mugerwa Rajj, Smith Mateega. It was produced at LIMIT Production, a media production company ran by Richard Mulindwa himself. Filming for most of the film took place in Kasensero, Rakai District.

Awards & Nominations

References

External
 
 Top 10 movies about the 1994 Genocide against the Tutsi

Films set in Uganda
Films shot in Uganda
Ugandan war films
2018 films
2010s war films
Films set in Rwanda
2010s English-language films